Maytenus procumbens is a bushy shrub or small tree growing along the coastal belt of southern and south-eastern South Africa.

References

procumbens